Main Post Office is a building in Zheleznodorozhny City District of Novosibirsk, Russia. It is located on the corner of Lenin and Sovetskaya streets. The building was built in 1916. Architect: Andrey Kryachkov.

History

The building was constructed by Andrey Kryachkov in 1914–1916. Originally it was a two-story building. The house was occupied by a branch of the Bogorodsko-Glukhovskaya Manufactory and belonged to the Moscow textile merchants Morozovs.

In 1922, the Post and Telegraph Office was located in the building.

In 1927, it was reconstructed. The building had been increased to four stories.

Gallery

References

Zheleznodorozhny City District, Novosibirsk
Buildings and structures in Novosibirsk
Government buildings completed in 1916
Cultural heritage monuments of regional significance in Novosibirsk Oblast